A licensed behavior analyst is a type of behavioral health professional in the United States. They have at least a master's degree, and sometimes a doctorate, in behavior analysis or a related field. Behavior analysts apply radical behaviorism, or applied behavior analysis, to people.

Defining the scope of practice 
The Behavior Analyst Certification Board (BACB) defines behavior analysis as follows:

The analysis. The experimental analysis of behavior (EAB) is the basic science of this field and has over many decades accumulated a substantial and well-respected research literature. This literature provides the scientific foundation for applied behavior analysis (ABA), which is both an applied science that develops methods of changing behavior and a profession that provides services to meet diverse behavioral needs. Briefly, professionals in applied behavior analysis engage in the specific and comprehensive use of principles of learning, including operant and respondent learning, in order to address behavioral needs of widely varying individuals in diverse settings. Examples of these applications include: building the skills and achievements of children in school settings; enhancing the development, abilities, and choices of children and adults with different kinds of disabilities; and augmenting the performance and satisfaction of employees in organizations and businesses.

As the above suggests, behavior analysis is based on the principles of operant and respondent conditioning. This places behavior analysis as one of the dominant models of behavior management, behavioral engineering and behavior therapy.  Behavior analysis is an active, environmental based approach and some behavior analytic procedures are considered highly restrictive (see least restrictive environment). For example, these service may make access to preferred items contingent on performance. This has led to abuses in the past, in particular where punishment programs have been involved. In addition, failure to be an independent profession often leads behavior analysts and other behavior modifiers to have their ethical codes supplanted by those of other professions. For example, a behavior analyst working in the hospital setting might design a token economy, a form of contingency management. He may desire to meet his ethical obligation to make the program habilitative and in the clients' best long-term interest. The physicians and nurses in the hospital who supervise him may decide that the token economy should instead create order in the nursing routines so clients get their medication quickly and efficiently. Instead of the ethical code of the Behavior Analysis Certification Board and the Association for Behavior Analysis International's position that those receiving treatment have a right to effective treatment and a right to effective education. In addition, failure on the part of a behavior analyst to adequately supervise his or her workers could lead to abuse. Finally, misrepresentations of the field and historical problems between academics has led to frequent calls to professionalize behavior analysis.

In general, there is wide support within the profession for licensure.

Range of populations worked with

The professional practice of behavior analysis ranges from treatment of individuals with autism and developmental disabilities to behavioral coaching and behavioral psychotherapy. In addition to treatment of mental health problems and corrections, the professional practice of behavior analysis includes organizational behavioral management, behavioral safety and even maintaining the behavioral health of astronauts while within and beyond earth's orbit.

Certification
The Behavior Analyst Certification Board (BACB) and the Qualified Applied Behavior Analysis Credentialing Board (QABA®) offers a technical certificates in behavior analysis. These certifications are internationally recognized. These certifications states the level of training and requires an exam to show a minimum level of competence to call oneself a board certified behavior analyst (BCBA) or qualified behavior analyst (QBA). Certification came about because of many ethical issues with behavioral interventions being delivered including the use of aversive and humiliating treatments in the name of behavior modification. American psychological association offers a diplomate (post Ph.D. and licensed certification) in behavioral psychology.

The meaning of certification
BACB and QABA are a private organizations without governmental powers to regulate behavior analytic practice. While the BACB and QABA certifications means that candidates have satisfied entry-level requirements in behavior analytic training, certificants may require a government license for independent practice when treating behavioral health or medical problems. Licensed certificants must operate within the scope of their license and must practice within their areas of expertise. Where the government regulates behavior analytic services unlicensed certificants must be supervised by a licensed professional and operate within the scope of their supervisor's license when treating disorders. Unlicensed certificants who provide behavior analytic training for educational or optimal performance purposes do not require licensed supervision. Where the government does not regulate the treatment of medical or psychological disorders certificants should practice in accord with the laws of their state, province, or country. All certificants must practice within their personal areas of expertise.

Licensure
Recently, a move has occurred to license behavior analysts. Licensure's purpose is to protect the public from employing unqualified practitioners.

The model licensing act states that a person is a behavior analyst by training and experience.  The person seeking licensure must have mastered behavior analysis by achieving a master's degree in behavior analysis or related subject matter. Like all other master level licensed professions (see counseling and licensed professional counselor) the model act sets the standard for a master's degree. This requirement states that the person has achieved textbook knowledge of behavior analysis which can be then tested through the exam offered by the Behavior Analyst Certification Board or the one offered by the QABA. It also requires an internship in which a behavior analysts works under another master or Ph.D. level behavior analyst for a period of one year (750 hours) with at least two hours/week of supervision. Finally, those 750 hours are considered tutelage time. After that, the behavior analyst must engage in supervised practice under a behavior analyst for a period of another 2 years (2,000 hours).

Once this process is complete, the person applies to a state board who ensures that he or she has indeed met the above conditions.  Once the person is licensed public protection is still monitored by the licensing board, which makes sure that the person receives sufficient ongoing education, and the licensing board investigates ethical complaints. A licensed behavior analyst would have equal training, knowledge, skills and abilities in their discipline as would a mental health counselor or marriage and family therapist in their discipline. In February 2008, Indiana, Arizona, Massachusetts, Vermont, Oklahoma and other states now have legislation pending to create licensure for behavior analysts. Pennsylvania was the first state in 2008 to license "behavior specialists" to cover behavior analysts. Arizona, less than three weeks later, became the first state to license "behavior analysts." Other states such as New York, Nevada and Wisconsin also have passed behavior analytic licensure.

Other countries
Recently licensure efforts have occurred in Canada for behavior analysts.

Professional organizations
The Association for Behavior Analysis International has a special interest group for practitioner issues, which focuses on key issues related to licensing behavior analysts. In addition, they have a practice board and a policy board to handle legislative issues ABA:I. Finally, the association has recently put out its own model licensing act for behavior analysts.

Association for behavior analysis international serves as the core intellectual home for behavior analysts. The Association for Behavior Analysis International sponsors 2 conferences per year – one in the U.S. and one international.

See also
 Professional practice of behavior analysis

References

Mental health occupations
Mental health in the United States
Applied psychology
Behavior modification
Cognitive behavioral therapy
Behaviorism

de:Applied Behavior Analysis
fr:Analyse du comportement appliquée
nl:Toegepaste gedragsanalyse
pt:Profissional de saúde mental